Iñaki Ábalos (Donostia, 1956) is a Spanish  architect and author.

Ábalos is a graduate of Superior Technical School of Architecture of Madrid, and from 2013 to 2016 he was Professor in Residence and Chair of the Department of Architecture at the Harvard University Graduate School of Design.  He had also taught at Columbia University, the Architectural Association, Princeton University, and Cornell University.

Ábalos has stated that his favorite own design is Woermann Tower in Las Palmas, and names Kazuyo Sejima and Jacques Herzog among contemporaries producing interesting things.

Published works
The Good Life: A Guided Visit to the Houses of Modernity, Gustavo Gili, 2001.
Tower and Office, From Modernist Theory to Contemporary Practice, MIT Press, 2003.
Essays On Thermodynamics, Architecture and Beauty by Iñaki Ábalos (Author), Renata Snetkiewicz (Author), Lluis Ortega (Editor), 2015.

References

Living people
Spanish expatriates in the United States
People from San Sebastián
20th-century Spanish architects
21st-century Spanish architects
Harvard Graduate School of Design faculty
Columbia University faculty
Princeton University faculty
Cornell University faculty
Technical University of Madrid alumni
Year of birth missing (living people)
Architects from the Basque Country (autonomous community)